The Joseph Stanton House (also known as the Wilcox Tavern) is a historic house at 5153 Old Post Road (U.S. Route 1) in Charlestown, Rhode Island.  The main house is a 2-½ story wood-frame structure built some time before 1739 by Joseph Stanton II, and it is where his son Joseph Stanton, Jr. was born.  The exterior has a relatively plain finish except for its front door surround, a 19th-century Greek Revival alteration with sidelight windows and pilasters supporting an entablature.  A 1930s addition to the rear of the house provides additional space for modern restaurant facilities.  The house belonged to Stanton, Jr. until 1811, one of Rhode Island's first United States Senators.  He sold it to Edward Wilcox who began operating a tavern on the premises.  An obelisk stands nearby memorializing Stanton.

The house was listed on the National Register of Historic Places in 1980.

See also
National Register of Historic Places listings in Washington County, Rhode Island

References

External links
Wilcox Tavern website

Buildings and structures in Charlestown, Rhode Island
Houses in Washington County, Rhode Island
Houses completed in 1739
Houses on the National Register of Historic Places in Rhode Island
National Register of Historic Places in Washington County, Rhode Island
1739 establishments in the Thirteen Colonies
1730s establishments in Rhode Island
Colonial architecture in Rhode Island